The 1889 Kerry Senior Football Championship was the inaugural staging of the Kerry Senior Football Championship since its establishment by the Kerry County Board. 

On 26 May 1889, Laune Rangers won the championship following a 0-06 to 0-03 defeat of Dr. Crokes in the final at the Kerry County Athletic Club grounds.

Teams

Fifteen teams entered for the Co. Senior Football Championship – Killorglin (Laune Rangers), Tralee Mitchels, Iremore/Lixnaw, Ashill, Killorglin (Harrington’s), Barraduff, Brosna, Kenmare, Killarney (Dr. Crokes), Rathmore, Listowel, Castlegregory, Castleisland, O Brennan, Kilgarvin.

Results

Final

Championship statistics

Miscellaneous
 Laune Rangers win the inaugural championship.

References

Kerry Senior Football Championship